Ming Kai, better known as Clearlove, is a Chinese former professional League of Legends player, and current supervisor for Edward Gaming of the League of Legends Pro League (LPL). He is one of China's most well-known League of Legends players and is a veteran of the region. He was ranked third by ESPN in their 2016 top ten list for League of Legends pros.

In December 2019 Clearlove retired from professional play and moved on to coaching duties. However, he announced his return to professional play in December 2020.

References

External links
 

Living people
Chinese esports players
Edward Gaming players
Team WE players
1997 births
League of Legends jungle players
League of Legends coaches